Samstagern is a railway station in the Swiss canton of Zurich and municipality of Richterswil. It takes its name from the nearby village of Samstagern. The station is on the Pfäffikon SZ to Arth-Goldau line, and the Wädenswil to Einsiedeln railway line, which are owned by the Südostbahn. The two lines separate to the north and west of the station.

The station is served by Zurich S-Bahn services S13, from Einsiedeln to Wädenswil, and S40, from Einsiedeln to Rapperswil.

The station is the location of a Südostbahn railway depot and workshop.

References

External links 
 

Samstagern
Samstagern
Richterswil